Jason Matthews (1951 – April 28, 2021) was an American author of espionage novels and former CIA officer, best known for the Red Sparrow spy novel trilogy.

Personal life
Jason was married to Suzanne, also a former officer.  He died April 28, 
2021 at the age of 69 from corticobasal degeneration.

Career

Prior to becoming a novelist, Matthews spent 33 years working for the CIA.  While in the CIA he was officially a diplomat, in Europe, Asia, and the Caribbean, but his real job was recruiting and then managing foreign agents.

In 2014, his first novel, Red Sparrow (2013), won an Edgar Award for Best First Novel by an American Author. Writer and critic Art Taylor praised it in The Washington Post, writing that it "isn't just a fast-paced thriller—it's a first-rate novel as noteworthy for its superior style as for its gripping depiction of a secretive world." It was adapted into a movie of the same name starring Jennifer Lawrence.

In 2015 and 2018, he published Palace of Treason and The Kremlin’s Candidate which are the sequels to Red Sparrow.

Works 

Novels.

Red Sparrow trilogy:
 Red Sparrow (2013)
 Palace of Treason (2015)
 The Kremlin's Candidate (2018)

Adaptations 

 Red Sparrow (2018), film directed by Francis Lawrence, based on novel Red Sparrow

Awards 

 2014 ITW Thriller Award for Best First Novel, for Red Sparrow
 2014 Edgar Award for Best First Novel by an American Author, for Red Sparrow

References

External links
 

1951 births
2021 deaths
American spy fiction writers
Edgar Award winners
People of the Central Intelligence Agency
Deaths from corticobasal degeneration